Gigaspermaceae  may refer to:
 Gigaspermataceae, a family of fungi in the order Agaricales, originally published with the spelling Gigaspermaceae
 Gigaspermaceae (moss), a family of mosses in order Funariales